Exaltación is a town in Vaca Diéz Province in the Beni Department of northern Bolivia.

External links
Satellite map at Maplandia.com

Populated places in Beni Department